Sodus Township may refer to:

Sodus Township, Michigan
Sodus Township, Lyon County, Minnesota

Township name disambiguation pages